is a Japanese educational anime series produced by NHK Educational. The first season started airing on April 29, 2015 for 13 episodes before ending on July 30, 2015. It is renewed with a second season in February 2017.

Plot
The story begins in the future when Earth itself is no longer inhabitable by living creatures. Humans began their interstellar migration with space colonies. Vince and Hana work as researchers in the Cambrian Project. Together with the creature Pikaia, they seek the Lost Code, the key to restoring Earth, and aim to return to Cambrian-era Earth.

Characters

References

External links
 
 

2015 anime television series debuts
2017 anime television series debuts
Anime with original screenplays
Production I.G
OLM, Inc.
Prehistoric life in popular culture
Science fiction anime and manga